HMS Woodpecker, pennant number U08, was a  sloop of the Royal Navy. She was active during the Second World War and was a successful anti-submarine warfare vessel, being credited with the destruction of six U-boats.

Construction
Woodpecker was ordered on 13 April 1940 under the 1940 Building Programme; she was laid down by William Denny & Brothers of Dumbarton, Scotland on 23 February 1941. She was launched on 29 June 1942, and commissioned 14 December the same year, with a build time of 23 months and 10 days.
The Black Swan design was subject to many modifications during the building process, which were later consolidated into the Modified Black Swan design. Although Woodpecker was ordered under the original design, her late build meant she incorporated many of these modifications and is consequently listed in some sources as one of the Modified Black Swan class.

Service history
After commissioning, Woodpecker was assigned to convoy escort duty. In April, Woodpecker joined 2nd Support Group, a highly successful anti-submarine warfare group under the command of FJ Walker.

In February Woodpecker, and 2 SG, were on support duty in the Atlantic, though they saw little action.

In June they were assigned to the Bay of Biscay, supporting Coastal Command's Operation Musketry.

Following the end of Musketry Woodpecker was docked for an extensive refit, remaining there until the end of the year.

In January 1944 Woodpecker, under the command of Commander H. L. Pryse, RNR, rejoined 2SG, which was on support duty in the South-Western Approaches. In February Woodpecker took part in the famous "Six in one trip" episode, during which she was credited  with sharing the destruction of three U-boats. Three days later Woodpecker and others caught and destroyed . On 19 February, while supporting ON 224, Woodpecker and others destroyed  after a seven-hour hunt.

While being towed toward home, on 27 February 1944 Woodpecker foundered and sank in an Atlantic storm. The skeleton crew was rescued before the ship went under.

Woodpecker was the only ship belonging to 2SG to be sunk. She had shared in six of the groups 23 victories.

Battle honours
During her service Woodpecker was awarded two battle honours:
Biscay 1943
Atlantic 1943–44

Successes
During her service Woodpecker participated in the sinking of six U-boats:

Notes

References
 Clay Blair : Hitler's U-Boat War Vol II: The Hunted 1942–1945 (1998) 
R Gardiner, R Gray : Conway's All the World's Fighting Ships 1906–1921 (1985)  
Arnold Hague : The Allied Convoy System 1939–1945 (2000).  (Canada);  (UK).
Paul Kemp  : U-Boats Destroyed  (1997) 
Axel Neistle  : German U-Boat Losses during World War II  (1998). 
Warlow, B : Battle Honours of the Royal Navy (2004)

Publications

External links
HMS Woodpecker at navalhistory.net

HMS Woodpecker at britainsnavy.co.uk

 

Black Swan-class sloops
World War II sloops of the United Kingdom
Ships sunk by German submarines in World War II
Sloops of the United Kingdom
Ships built on the River Clyde
1942 ships
Maritime incidents in February 1944
World War II shipwrecks in the Atlantic Ocean